The surname Constantinidis, Constantinides, Konstantinidis, Konstantinides is a patronymic surname which literally means "the son of Konstantinos (Constantinos, Kostas, Costas)".  It may refer to:

Alexandros Konstantidis (born 1988), Greek footballer
Anthony G. Constantinides (born 1943), professor
Aris Konstantinidis (1913–1993), a Greek architect
Aristidis Konstantinidis, Greek racing cyclist
Billy Konstantinidis (born 1986), Greek-Australian footballer
Charly Konstantinidis (born 1985), Belgian footballer
Costa Constantinides (born 1975), Council member for the 22nd District of the New York City Council
Dimitris Konstantinidis (born 1994), Greek footballer
Dinos Constantinides (1929–2021), Greek-American composer
Fotis Konstantinidis (born 1978), Greek footballer
George Constantinides (born 1947), American economist
Konstantinos Konstantinidis (1856–1930), Greek merchant
Kostas Konstantinidis (born 1972), Greek footballer
Melina Eleni Kanakaredes Constantinides (born 1967), American actress
Pantelis Konstantinidis (born 1975), Greek footballer
Sotiris Konstantinidis (born 1977), Greek footballer
Stephanos Constantinides (born 1941), Canadian scholar
Sylvia Constantinidis (born 1962), Venezuelan-American pianist
Thucydides Konstantinides, birth name of Archbishop Michael of America
Efthymios Constantinides (born 1955), Greek-Dutch scholar

See also
Constantinidi

Greek-language surnames
Surnames
Patronymic surnames
Surnames from given names